Ha Yu-jeong (Hangul: 하유정; born 26 December 1989) is a South Korean volleyball player. She is part of the South Korea women's national volleyball team. She was part of the team at the 2012 Summer Olympics, finishing 4th. On club level she played for Korea Expressway Corporation in 2014.

Education
Daegu Girls' High School
Daegu Il Middle School
Bisan Elementary School

References

External links
 Profile at FIVB.org

 Ha Jun-im Fancafe at Daum 

1989 births
Living people
People from Gumi, North Gyeongsang
South Korean women's volleyball players
Volleyball players at the 2012 Summer Olympics
Olympic volleyball players of South Korea
Sportspeople from North Gyeongsang Province